Dudi Fadlon (born 16 September 1976) is a retired Israeli footballer.

He was born in Rishon LeZion

Honours
Liga Leumit:
Runner-up (1): 2003-04

References

External links
 

1976 births
Living people
Israeli Jews
Israeli footballers
Hapoel Tzafririm Holon F.C. players
Hapoel Petah Tikva F.C. players
Hapoel Nof HaGalil F.C. players
Maccabi Netanya F.C. players
Hapoel Be'er Sheva F.C. players
Hapoel Acre F.C. players
Hapoel Ramat Gan F.C. players
Liga Leumit players
Israeli Premier League players
Israeli people of Libyan-Jewish descent
Footballers from Rishon LeZion
Association football defenders